South Korean Foreigners is a South Korean television show. The show aired every Wednesday at 20:30 (KST) starting from October 17, 2018 to December 21, 2022.

Cast member
 Kim Yong-man (presenter)
 Park Myung-soo
 Han Hyun-min

Foreigners
 John Rock
 Mack Rock
 Albrecht Huwe
 Angelina Danilova
 Sujan Shakya
 Andreas Varsakopoulos
 Carlos Gorito
 Abhishek Gupta
 Alberto Mondi
 Sam Okyere
 Vida Mohammad
 Moeka Sato
 Kris Johnson
 Lee Eva
 İrem Çıray

References

External links
 Official website

South Korean variety television shows
South Korean game shows
2020s South Korean television series
2018 South Korean television series debuts
Television shows set in South Korea
Multiculturalism in South Korea
Quiz shows
2023 South Korean television series endings